Alfonso Pérez de Guzmán y de Guzmán-Zúñiga, 5th Duke of Medina Sidonia (d. 1549) was the son of Juan Alfonso Pérez de Guzmán, 3rd Duke of Medina Sidonia and became Duke of Medina Sidonia in 1512 when his half brother, Enrique Pérez de Guzmán, 4th Duke of Medina Sidonia died childless.

Declared "impotent and stupid" ("mentecato", in 16th-century Spanish language) by King Charles I of Spain in 1518, his wife Ana de Aragón was the daughter of Alonso de Aragón, Archbishop of Zaragoza, the illegitimate son of Ferdinand II of Aragon. After the 5th duke's death, his widow married his brother Juan Alfonso, the 6th Duke.

1549 deaths
Year of birth unknown
Dukes of Medina Sidonia